The men's 800 metres event at the 2013 European Athletics Indoor Championships was held at March 1, 2013 at 18:35 (round 1), March 2, 16:55 (semi-final) and March 3, 11:30 (final) local time.

Records

Results

Round 1
Qualification: First 2 (Q) or and the 2 fastest athletes (q) advanced to the semifinal.

Semi-final 
Qualification: First 3 (Q) advanced to the final.

Final 
The final was held at 11:30.

References

800 metres at the European Athletics Indoor Championships
2013 European Athletics Indoor Championships